Australia competed at the 2017 World Aquatics Championships in Budapest, Hungary from 14 to 30 July.

Medalists

Diving

Australia has entered 10 divers (five male and five female).

Men

Women

Mixed

High diving

Australia qualified two female high divers.

Open water swimming

Australia has entered five open water swimmers

Swimming

Men

Women

Mixed

Synchronized swimming

Australia's synchronized swimming team consisted of 12 athletes (12 female).

Women

 Legend: (R) = Reserve Athlete

Water polo

Australia qualified both a men's and women's teams.

Men's tournament

Team roster

Edward Slade
Timothy Putt
George Ford
Joe Kayes
Nathan Power
Lachlan Edwards
Jarrod Gilchrist
Aaron Younger (C)
Andrew Ford
James Fannon
Lachlan Hollis
Nicolas Brooks
Anthony Hrysanthos

Group play

Playoffs

Quarterfinals

5th–8th place semifinals

Seventh place game

Women's tournament

Team roster

Lea Yanitsas
Keesja Gofers
Hannah Buckling
Bronte Halligan
Isobel Bishop
Amy Ridge
Rowie Webster (C)
Jessica Zimmerman
Joe Arancini
Lena Mihailovic
Morgan Baxter
Madeleine Steere
Lilian Hedges

Group play

Playoffs

Quarterfinals

5th–8th place semifinals

Seventh place game

References

Nations at the 2017 World Aquatics Championships
Australia at the World Aquatics Championships
2017 in Australian sport